James Francis Smith (January 28, 1859 – June 29, 1928) was an associate justice of the Supreme Court of the Philippines, Governor-General of the Philippines and an associate judge of the United States Court of Customs Appeals.

Education and career

Born on January 28, 1859, in San Francisco, California, Smith received a Bachelor of Science degree in 1877 from Santa Clara University and received a Bachelor of Arts degree and Master of Arts degree in 1878 from the same institution, then attended the University of California, Hastings College of the Law. He entered private practice in California from 1881 to 1898. He served in the United States Army from 1898 to 1901. He was the Collector of Customs for the Philippine Archipelago in Manila, Philippines from 1900 to 1901. He was an associate justice of the Supreme Court of the Philippines from 1901 to 1903. He was Secretary of Public Instruction for the United States Philippine Commission from 1903 to 1906. He was Vice Governor of the Philippines in 1906. He was Governor-General of the Philippines from 1906 to 1909.

In 1908, after the construction of a mansion in Baguio that would serve as the colonial government seat during summertime, Smith's family became the first residents of the building, with his wife wanting to escape the heat of Manila. He returned to private practice from 1909 to 1910. In 1909 he was photographed at the Alaska Yukon Pacific Exhibition in Seattle.

Federal judicial service

Smith was nominated by President William Howard Taft on March 9, 1910, to the United States Court of Customs Appeals (later the United States Court of Customs and Patent Appeals), to a new Associate Judge seat authorized by 36 Stat. 11. He was confirmed by the United States Senate on March 30, 1910, and received his commission the same day. His service terminated on June 29, 1928, due to his death in Washington, D.C.

Membership

Smith was a member of the Native Sons of the Golden West, Alcatraz Parlor No. 145.

Bibliography
A brief history of the United States Court of Customs and Patent Appeals by Giles S. Rich. Washington, D.C. : Published by authorization of Committee on the Bicentennial of Independence and the Constitution of the Judicial Conference of the United States : U.S. G.P.O., 1980.

References

Sources
 

1859 births
1928 deaths
20th-century American judges
Associate Justices of the Supreme Court of the Philippines
Governors-General of the Philippine Islands
Judges of the United States Court of Customs and Patent Appeals
Santa Clara University alumni
United States Article I federal judges appointed by William Howard Taft
University of California, Hastings College of the Law alumni